The  is the political leader of the Central Tibetan Administration, a Tibetan exile organisation also known as the Tibetan Government-in-Exile based on the 2011 Charter of Tibetans-in-exile. The title was created in 2012 after the 14th Dalai Lama decided not to assume any political and administrative authority as the head of the Tibetan Administration for Tibetans-in-exile.

The current Sikyong is Penpa Tsering. The Sikyong is the political leader of the Kashag, part of the executive branch of the Central Tibetan Administration. This office should not be confused with the "Chairman of the People's Government of the Tibet Autonomous Region".

The first directly elected Kalön Tripa was Lobsang Tenzin, the Samdhong Rinpoche, who was elected August 20, 2001. Based on the 13-Article Ordinance for the More Effective Governing of Tibet, Kashag should be composed of three temporal officials and one monk official. Each of them held the title of Kalön, should seek appointment from the Central Government.

Before 2011, the Kalön Tripa position was subordinate to the 14th Dalai Lama who presided over the government in exile from its founding. In 2011, the Dalai Lama announced that his political authority would be transferred to Sangay.

Kalön Tripa 
On September 20, 2012, the 15th Tibetan Parliament-in-Exile unanimously voted to change the title of Kalön Tripa to Sikyong in Article 19 of the Charter of the Tibetans in exile and relevant articles. The Dalai Lama had previously referred to the Kalon Tripa as Sikyong, and this usage was cited as the primary justification for the name change. According to Tibetan Review, "Sikyong" translates to "political leader". The online Dharma Dictionary translates sikyong (srid skyong) as "secular ruler; regime, regent".

Kalön Tripa

Tibet

Kashag

Sikyong

See also 
 2021 Central Tibetan Administration general election

References

External links 
 Speech/transcription
 Penpa Tsering sworn in as the Sikyong of 16th Kashag
 Key note address by Dr. Lobsang Sangay, Kalon Tripa, Tibetan Government in Exile on 06 September 2011 at the VIF Seminar on Tibet

 Elections
 Kalon Tripa election in 2011
 Kalön Tripa 2011 election results

Central Tibetan Administration